Jon "Mags" Maguire is a Welsh songwriter and record producer. He has appeared on over twenty UK top 40 records, including four number one albums. He is best known for writing "You Are The Reason" with Calum Scott which has sold over 15 million copies worldwide and has been streamed over 3.5 billion times.
Jon has written and produced for artists including Sam Feldt, Kodaline, Scouting For Girls, Calum Scott, You Me At Six, Tiesto, Leona Lewis, Rita Ora, Jax Jones, Tom Chaplin, The Vamps,Lost Frequencies and Armin van Buuren.

References

1988 births
British songwriters
British male singers
Welsh songwriters
Welsh male singers
21st-century Welsh male singers
People from Blackwood, Caerphilly
Welsh record producers
Living people
Welsh singer-songwriters
Alumni of the University of Wales, Newport
British male singer-songwriters